Zanderij is a village located in the northern part of Suriname, situated 50 kilometres south of the capital Paramaribo on the Southern East-West Link. The Johan Adolf Pengel International Airport is located near the village.

On 7 June 1989, Surinam Airways Flight 764 crashed in Zanderij, killing 178 of the 187 passengers on board including a group of professional Dutch football players. Only 11 people and a dog survived. The dog was named "Lucky" by the police.

References

External links

Populated places in Para District